Salida de la misa de doce de la Iglesia del Pilar de Zaragoza is an 1897 short silent film by Eduardo Jimeno, a pioneer of the Spanish cinema.

This short film is probably the first one filmed in Spain by a Spaniard.

Trivia
This film's title is Spanish translates to "Exit of the Mass of the Twelve of the Church of the Pillar of Zaragoza"

See also 
 Cinema of Spain
 List of Spanish films before 1930

External links 

 
 

1890s short documentary films
1897 films
Spanish silent short films
Spanish black-and-white films
1897 short films
Films shot in Spain